Brandon P. Bell (born January 13, 1985) is an American actor, who is best known for his roles on the television series Hollywood Heights and Dear White People.

Early life
Born in Minneapolis, Minnesota, he attended the University of Southern California with a drama scholarship. Prior to focusing full time on his acting career, Bell played soccer for seven years traveling to France and winning the USA Cup Gold Medal.

Career
Bell landed the role of Jake Madsen in the 2012 television series Hollywood Heights. In 2014, he starred as Troy Fairbanks in comedy-drama film Dear White People, which was adapted into a Netflix series of the same name.

Filmography

Films

Television series

Awards and nominations

References

External links
 

Male actors from Dallas
American male film actors
21st-century American male actors
African-American male actors
American male television actors
1985 births
Living people
University of Southern California alumni
21st-century African-American people
20th-century African-American people